Connecticut's 38th House of Representatives district elects one member of the Connecticut House of Representatives. It consists of the town of Waterford and part of Montville. It has been represented by Republican Kathleen McCarty since 2015.

Recent elections

2020

2018

2016

2014

2012

References

38